Read & Burn 03 is an EP by English rock band Wire. It is the third entry in their Read & Burn EP series. It was released on 13 November 2007, five years after Read & Burn 01 and 02.

Track listing

References

External links 

 
 

2007 EPs
Wire (band) EPs